Stéphane Demilly (born 26 June 1963 in Albert, Somme) is a French politician of the Union of Democrats and Independents (UDI) who served as a member of the National Assembly of France from 2002 until 2020, representing the Somme department.

In parliament, Demilly served on the Committee on Economic Affairs (2002-2007), the Defense Committee (2007-2009, 2017-2018) and the Committee on Sustainable Development and Spatial Planning (2009-2020). In addition to his committee assignments, he was a member of the French delegation to the Parliamentary Assembly of the Organization for Security and Co-operation in Europe (OSCE) from 2007 until 2020.

From June 2017, Demilly co-chaired the UDI and Independents group in the National Assembly, alongside Franck Riester.

References

1963 births
Living people
People from Albert, Somme
Union for French Democracy politicians
The Centrists politicians
French Senators of the Fifth Republic
Deputies of the 12th National Assembly of the French Fifth Republic
Deputies of the 13th National Assembly of the French Fifth Republic
Deputies of the 14th National Assembly of the French Fifth Republic
Deputies of the 15th National Assembly of the French Fifth Republic
Union of Democrats and Independents politicians